The Woodill Wildfire was an American sports car built by Dodge and Willys dealer Blanchard Robert "Woody" Woodill from 1952 to 1958 in Downey, California. The Wildfire used a Glasspar fiberglass body and is credited with being the first complete fiberglass car available with approximately 15 produced and another 285 sold as kits. A child's version of the vehicle called the Brushfire was also available.

In September 2012 a Woodill Wildfire was featured on the Discovery Channel TV show Fast N' Loud. According to the show, theirs was one of only nine factory-built Wildfires still known to exist. The show's host sold the car to a collector for $100,500. Payment for the car consisted of ten $10,000 stacks of $100 bills and a 1934 $500 bill, the latter of which in itself is worth more than its face value.

See also

References

External links 
 Woodill Wildfire
 History of the Woodill Wildfire by Frederick J. Roth

Sports cars
Defunct motor vehicle manufacturers of the United States